François Craenhals (15 November 1926 – 2 August 2004) was a Belgian comics artist best known for the comic series Chevalier Ardent and Les 4 As.

Biography
François Craenhals was born in Evere in 1926. He was a fan of American comics by Alex Raymond and Hal Foster, and created his first comic Karan in the vein of Tarzan at the end of the 1940s. For the weekly magazine Le Soir Illustré, he made at the same time a medieval comic about a knight.

When he presented these comics to Tintin magazine, he was accepted as art director and gradually started making short comics for the magazine. His first main series debuted in 1953: Pom et Teddy was a series about a boy and a girl and their pet donkey, and the first stories were gentle stories about a circus.

Craenhals soon became one of the main producers of comics for magazines and newspapers, and a number of collaborators joined his studio. He worked for the Averbode magazine Petits Belges, and published for many years Primus et Musette in La Libre Belgique. He was one of the first comics artists to join Hergé at the editor Casterman, where his two main series were published: the juvenile Les 4 As about a band of four youngsters (three boys and a girl) and their over-the-top adventures; and the more adult, Prince Valiant-inspired Chevalier Ardent (The Brave Knight), about a young knight in the Middle Ages. Both series were reasonable good selling series, and the latter was a critical success as well.

In the 1990s, Craenhals moved to Rivières-de-Theyrargues in the south of France, where he continued drawing his two series until his death in 2004 in Montpellier.

Bibliography

His comics have been translated in many languages, including Dutch, German and Swedish.

Awards
 1976: Best Story at the Prix Saint-Michel, Belgium

Notes

Sources
 Béra, Michel; Denni, Michel; and Mellot, Philippe (1998): "Trésors de la Bande Dessinée 1999–2000". Paris, Les éditions de l'amateur.

External links
 Biography at Comiclopedia (Last retrieved 25 October 2006)
 Bio- and bibliography at Casterman  (Last retrieved 25 October 2006)

1926 births
2004 deaths
Belgian comics artists
People from Evere